Alice Bendová, née Veselá (born 1 November 1973, Prague) is a Czech actress and model.

Selected filmography

Films 
 Báječná léta pod psa (1997)
 John Sinclair (německý seriál, 1998)
 Studená válka (Německo, 1998)
 Love Lies Bleeding (USA, 1999)
 A Knight's Tale (USA, 2001)
 Duše jako kaviár (2004)
 Sametoví vrazi (2005)
 Rána z milosti (2005) (TV)
 Všechno nejlepší! (2006)
 Kajínek (2010)
 Dešťová víla (2010)
 Kandidát (2013)
 Kameňák 4 (2013)
 Vánoční Kameňák (2015)

TV series 
 The Immortal (Kanada, 1998)
 Rodinná pouta (od 2004)
 Hop nebo trop (2004)
 Bazén (2005)
 Letiště (2006)
 Velmi křehké vztahy (2007 - 2009)
 Profesionálové (2009)
 Základka (2012)
 Svatby v Benátkách (2014 - 2015)
 Bezdružice (2015)
 Polda (od 2016)

Personal life
Alice Bendová had been married to Václav Benda (a former ice hockey player) for many years before she began dating Michal Topol. She has a son and a daughter.

References

External links 
 Instagram profile
 

Czech television actresses
Czech film actresses
1973 births
Living people
Actresses from Prague
20th-century Czech actresses
21st-century Czech actresses